The 2011–12 Persian Gulf Cup (also known as Iran Pro League) was the 29th season of Iran's Football League and 11th as Iran Pro League since its establishment in 2001. Sepahan were the defending champions. The season featured 15 teams from the 2010–11 Persian Gulf Cup and three new teams promoted from the 2010–11 Azadegan League: Damash as champions, Mes Sarcheshmeh and Fajr Sepasi. The league started on 2 August 2011 and ended on 11 May 2012. Sepahan won the Pro League title for the fourth time in their history (total fourth Iranian title).

Teams

Stadia and locations

Personnel and kits

Note: Flags indicate national team as has been defined under FIFA eligibility rules. Players may hold more than one non-FIFA nationality.

Managerial changes

Before the start of the season

In season

League table

Positions by round

Results

Clubs season-progress

Statistics

Top Goalscorers 

1 Siamak Kouroshi from Naft Tehran 2 owne goals. 
Last updated: 16 May 2012 Source: IPL Stats

Top Assistants 

Last updated: 16 May 2012 Source: IPL Stats

Cards 

Last updated: 16 May 2012  Source: IPL stats

Matches played 

Last updated: 16 May 2012Source:  IPL stats

Hat-tricks

Fastest hat-trick of the season
 Éamon Zayed for Persepolis against Esteghlal, 9 minutes (2 February 2012)

Scoring
First goal of the season: Hossein Kazemi own goal for Zob Ahan against Rah Ahan (2 August 2011)
Fastest goal of the season: 10 seconds – Pejman Shahpari for Saba against Foolad (16 October 2011)
Widest winning margin: 5 goals
Saipa 5–0 Fajr Sepasi (9 March 2012)
Highest scoring game: 7 goals
Malavan 3–4 Sepahan (16 April 2012)
Persepolis 3–4 Rah Ahan (6 May 2012)
Most goals scored in a match by a single team: 5 goals
Tractor Sazi 5–1 Shahrdari Tabriz (25 September 2011)
Saipa 5–0 Fajr Sepasi (9 March 2012)
Most goals scored in a match by a losing team: 3 goals
Malavan 3–4 Sepahan (16 April 2012)
Persepolis 3–4 Rah Ahan (6 May 2012)

Awards

Monthly awards

Annual awards

Team of the Season
Goalkeeper: Rahman Ahmadi (Sepahan)
Defence: Ehsan Hajsafi (Tractor Sazi), Pejman Montazeri (Esteghlal), Jalal Hosseini (Sepahan), Hossein Mahini (Zob Ahan)
Midfield: Ali Karimi (Persepolis), Omid Ebrahimi (Sepahan), Mojtaba Jabbari (Esteghlal), Flávio Paixão (Tractor Sazi)
Attack: Founéké Sy (Sanat Naft), Karim Ansarifard (Saipa)

Player of the Season
Goal.com selected Farhad Majidi as the best player of the first half of the season and Ali Karimi as the best player of the second half. Karim Ansarifard and Omid Alishah also won the best young players of the tournament.

Attendances

Average home attendances

Highest attendances

Notes:Updated to games played on 11 May 2012. Source: iplstats.com

See also 
 2011–12 Azadegan League
 2011–12 Iran Football's 2nd Division
 2011–12 Iran Football's 3rd Division
 2011–12 Hazfi Cup
 Iranian Super Cup
 2011–12 Iranian Futsal Super League
Team season articles
 2011–12 Zob Ahan
 2011–12 Persepolis
 2011–12 Rah Ahan
 2011–12 Esteghlal
 2011–12 Tractor Sazi
 2011–12 Sepahan

References

External links
 2011–12 Persian Gulf Cup at PersianLeague
 2011–12 Persian Gulf Cup at Soccerway

Iran Pro League seasons
Iran
1